Short codes, or short numbers, are short digit sequences, significantly shorter than telephone numbers, that are used to address messages in the Multimedia Messaging System (MMS) and short message service (SMS) systems of mobile network operators. In addition to messaging, they may be used in abbreviated dialing.

Short codes are designed to be easier to read and remember than telephone numbers. Short codes are unique to each operator at the technological level. Even so, providers generally have agreements to avoid overlaps. In some countries, such as the United States, some classes of numbers are inter-operator (used by multiple providers or carriers, U.S. inter-operator numbers are called common short codes).

Short codes are widely used for value-added services such as charity donations, mobile services, ordering ringtones, and television program voting. Messages sent to a short code can be billed at a higher rate than a standard SMS and may even subscribe a customer to a recurring monthly service that will be added to the customer's mobile phone bill until the user texts, for example, the word "STOP" to terminate the service.

Short codes and service identifiers (prefix) 
Short codes are often associated with automated services. An automated program can handle the response and typically requires the sender to start the message with a command word or prefix. The service then responds to the command appropriately.

In ads or in other printed material where a provider has to provide both a prefix and the short code number, the advertisement will typically follow this format:
Example 1 - Long version:  Text Football to 72404 for latest football news.
Example 2 - Short version: football@72404

Regional differences

Albania 
Short Codes are five digits in length and start with 5, also are known as short codes for value added service.

Australia 
Short codes are six or eight digits in length, starting with the prefix "19" followed by an additional four or six digits and two. Communications Alliance Ltd and WMC Global are responsible for governing premium and standard rate short codes in Australia. Transactional and Subscription services require a double sms MO opt-in or Web based opt-in with an MO reply.

Bangladesh 
Codes are five digits in length. Bangladesh Telecommunication Regulatory Commission (BTRC) issues and controls short codes in Bangladesh.

Belgium 
Codes are four digits in length.

Botswana 
Codes are three digits in length.

Brazil 
Codes are five digits in length.

Cambodia 
Short Codes are four digits in length and start with 1.

Canada 
Canadian Common Short Codes can be five or six digits long. Common Short Codes beginning with a leading '4' are reserved for private use by wireless network operators. Four-digit Common Short Codes are not permitted due to handset incompatibilities. Short code-based messages vary between zero-rated (paid for by campaign), standard rate (user is responsible for standard carrier charges), and premium rate (varies, C$1-10). Canadian Short codes are governed by the Canadian Wireless Telecommunications Association.

In February 2020, CWTA (Canadian Wireless Telecommunications Association) announced that Rogers Wireless will no longer participate in general use mobile codes in the future. A common short code is a code that is shared by more than one brand for multiple or general uses.

Chile 
Codes are three and four digits in length.

Czech Republic
Messages sent to/from these short codes are known as Premium Rate SMS. Codes are seven digits in length for MO and five (not billed) or eight (billed) for MT direction, starting with nine, while two or three (depending on billing type=MO/MT) trailing digits express the price, e.g. SMS sent to 9090930 is billed for Kč30. Leading three digits are purpose type prefixes (908 for micro payments, 909 for adult content and 900 for everything else), digits at position four and five determines the service provider registered by a network operator. There are also other four digit shortcodes, used by a network operators for service only purposes (operator dependent)

Denmark 
Codes are four digits in length.

Dominican Republic 
Codes are four or five digits in length.

Ethiopia 
Codes are four digits in length and start with 8, like 8xxx. Although the telecom sector in Ethiopia is controlled by the government, short code services are outsourced to the private sector. The short codes are used mostly for fundraising, lottery and polling.

European Union  
Common EU-wide codes start with 11. Examples include: 118xxx - directory services, 116xxx - emergency helplines. This is in addition to the EU-wide emergency number 112.

Faroe islands 
Codes are four digits in length, beginning with "12" or "19".

Finland 
Codes are five or more digits in length, usually five or six.

France 
Codes are five digits in length. Starting digits define the cost of the service.

Germany 
Codes are four or five digits in length.

Greece 
Codes are five digits in length.

Hong Kong 
Codes are four to eight digits in length, start with digits 501-509.  Emergency number is 992.

Hungary 
Codes are four or five digits in length.

India 
There are many companies in the Indian market who rent keywords, on a monthly basis, whose characters, on a typical telephone keypad, represent short codes.  Short codes are five digits in length and have to start with the digit  '5'. The five digits can be extended by three digits further representing three additional characters. Texts sent to these Short Codes are commonly referred to as Premium Rate SMS Messages and cost around Rs 1 to Rs 3 per text depending on the operator as well as the service. Any length of full message can be sent, ranging from 100–500 (some providers only support).

Indonesia 
Codes are four digits in length with Rp2000 premium price.

Republic of Ireland 
Short codes are five digits in length, and start with 5. The second digit generally indicates the maximum price, with 0 = completely free, 1 = standard text rate only, 3 = €0.60, and 7 having no maximum. Codes beginning 59 are ostensibly intended for adult services, but few if any of these codes are used.

Italy 
In Italy, short codes have no fixed length, starting from three digits up to five. All short codes that start with the digit "4", are designated by a local telecommunications law for "network services". Widely known short codes are in the 48xxx range, commercial ringtones and mobile stuff download.

Korea, South 
Codes are generally four to six digits in length, however short codes have no fixed length.

Latvia 
In Latvia short codes also have no fixed length, starting from three digits up to five. All 4 digit short codes that start with "118" or 5 digit short codes that start with "1184" are designated to information service providers.

Lithuania 
In Lithuania, short codes also have no fixed length, starting from three digits up to five. All short codes that start with the digit "1", are designated by a local telecommunications law for "network services".

Malaysia 
Codes are five digits in length, start with "2" or "3", premium pricing from RM0.30 up to 10.00. Codes are MT billed so subscription services are allowed. Upon service description approval by mobile operators, dedicated codes are generally live in 4 weeks, and shared codes after 1 week.

Morocco 
Code are four keys digits in length.

Nepal 
Codes are three to four digits in length. Dialing short codes are generally 3 digits, and reserved for public services. SMS shortcodes are used for a range of purposes, and are four digits.

The Netherlands 
Codes are four digits in length.

New Zealand 
Codes are three and four digits in length.

Nigeria 
Codes are four to five digits in length.

Norway 
Codes are four and five digits in length.

Pakistan 
Codes are three and four digits in length. Users are charged PKR 5 - PKR 25 per SMS sent on short codes. Mobile operators charge a setup fee, monthly fee and fee per keyword for short codes. Short codes usage must abide by the rules set by PTA (Pakistan Telecom Authority).

Panama 
Codes are four digits in length.

Poland 
Commercial codes are five digit long (1xxxx) and are reachable from both mobile and fixed networks. Calls to short codes - from any type of network - are routed based on the location of the number originating the call; hence, if wishing to reach a particular geographical area, the subscriber might need to prefix the short code with an appropriate area code.

The Philippines 
Codes are seven digits in length. The National Telecommunications Commission (NTC) is a regulatory agency providing an environment that ensures reliable, affordable and viable infrastructure and services in information and communications technology (ICT) accessible to all. Although the NTC is ultimately responsible for the governance of premium and non-premium shortcodes in the Philippines, the NTC's regulatory guidelines are not comprehensive when applied to shortcodes. Instead NTC's guidelines focus more on the carriers and the carrier's technical infrastructure. NTC's website does not contain any specific information with regard to premium SMS or standard rate SMS. There is relevant documentation for Bulk SMS and SPAM control via NTC's "AMENDMENT TO THE RULES AND REGULATIONS ON BROADCAST MESSAGING SERVICES", however again is not directly related to premium SMS.

Russia 
Codes are four digits in length. The cost of the call or SMS to the short number varies from 1.2 to 300 rubles, depending on the number and the carrier.

Serbia 
Codes are four digits in length.

Singapore 
Codes are five digits in length.

South Africa 
Codes are five digits in length. Short codes will start with either a "3" or "4". For example, 34001 or 42001. Each short code or short code range (a range will generally be 34000 to 34009) are assigned specific tariffs or end user prices (EUP). The tariff charges can range from R0.50 to R30.00 on mobile originated billing and from R0.50 to R50.00 using mobile terminated billing. Due to high costs associated with short code rental many providers offer shared shortcodes, which greatly reduces costs.

Spain 
Codes are four digits in length.

Sweden 
Codes are five digits in length.

Switzerland 
Codes are three to five digits in length (most popular codes are three digits long); codes starting with "6" are reserved for adult services.

Taiwan 
Codes are usually four digits in length, starting with digits "19".

Turkey 
Codes are four digits in length.

United Kingdom 
Codes are five digits in length, mostly starting with 6 or 8. Codes starting 70 are used by charities. The range of codes may be expanded in time to use other leading digits such as 4. Adult related mobile services must use codes starting with 69 or 89. Mobile operators sometimes use proprietary codes (either with a different leading digit or shorter in length for their own use). SMS short codes are often owned by holding companies who then lease them out to service providers and advertisers to promote SMS services, charitable fundraising and marketing promotions such as news alerts, voting and quizzes. Shortcodes can also be used to deliver additional content or a mobile URL link that when prompted opens the mobile web browser linking the user to a mobile web page. Premium SMS services use codes that can be set to deliver a charge to a participant's mobile phone (in accordance with the service provider's terms of service). Other codes (typically used by advertisers) can be free to receive “your standard rate applies” or free to send and receive. UK Premium rated SMS services are regulated by the Phone-paid Services Authority. All charges and associated terms linked to a premium code should be transparent to the consumer. To stop a subscription based shortcode service text the word 'STOP' to the shortcode number.

United States 
Standard, interoperable short codes in the U.S. are five or six digits long, never start with 1, and only work in the U.S. They are leased by the short code program's registry service provider iconectiv, under a deal with the Common Short Code Administration and CTIA. It costs twice as much to choose a specific code than it does to get one that is randomly assigned. Some carriers assign a subset of their carrier-specific codes to third parties.

"The Short Code Registry maintains a single database of available, reserved and registered short codes. CTIA administers the Common Short Code program, and iconectiv became the official U.S. Short Code Registry service provider in January, 2016. For more information, please see the Short Code Registry’s Best Practices and the Short Code Monitoring Handbook."

Texting "HELP" to a short code causes the short code service to return a message with terms and conditions, support informationconsisting of either a toll-free phone number or email address at a minimumand other information from the leaseholder of the short code. A user can opt-out from receiving any further messages from a short code service by texting "STOP", "END", "QUIT", "CANCEL", or "UNSUBSCRIBE" to the short code; after doing so, one final message confirming the opt-out is sent.

See also

Abbreviated dialing
Vertical service code

References

External links 
Australian short code search (Australian Communications and Media Authority)
Common Short Code Administration (U.S.)
Short Code Management Group (U.K.)